Hastings West was a federal electoral district in the province of Ontario, Canada, that was represented in the House of Commons of Canada from 1867 to 1925. It was created by the British North America Act of 1867 which divided the County of Hastings, divided into three ridings: Hastings West, Hastings East and Hastings North.

The West Riding consisted of the Town of Belleville, the Township of Sydney, and the Village of Trenton.

In 1903, the county of Hastings was divided into two ridings: Hastings West and Hastings East.

The west riding consisted of the townships of Sydney, Rawdon, Huntingdon, Marmora and Lake, Wollaston, Faraday, Herschel, McClure, Wicklow and Bangor, the city of Belleville, the town of Trenton, and the villages of Marmora and Sterling.

The electoral district was abolished in 1924 when it was redistributed between Hastings South and Hastings—Peterborough ridings.

Election results

On Mr. Robertson's death, 29 February 1888: 

On Mr. Corby's resignation, 22 June 1894:

On Mr. Corby's resignation, 28 February 1901:

On Mr. Porter's resignation, 28 June 1924:

See also 
 List of Canadian federal electoral districts
 Past Canadian electoral districts

References

External links 
Riding history from the Library of Parliament

Former federal electoral districts of Ontario